Ellenberg is a municipality in the German state of Baden-Württemberg, in Ostalbkreis district.

Mayor
Anna-Lisa Bohn was elected mayor in 2022. Her predecessor was Rainer Knecht, in office from 1993.

References

Ostalbkreis
Württemberg